Øvre Stjørdal or Øvre Stjørdalen is a former municipality in the old Nordre Trondhjem county in Norway. The  municipality existed from 1850 until its dissolution in 1874. The municipality encompassed the upper part of the Stjørdalen valley which includes what is now the municipality of Meråker and the Hegra area of the municipality of Stjørdal, both in Trøndelag county. The administrative centre of the municipality was the village of Hegra where the Hegra Church is located.

History
The municipality was established in 1850 when the old municipality of Stjørdalen was divided into Øvre Stjørdal (population: 5,100) and Nedre Stjørdal (population: 6,543). On 1 January 1874, the municipality of Øvre Stjørdal ceased to exist when it was split to form two new municipalities: Hegra (population: 3,409) in the east and Meraker (population: 1,861) in the west.

Name
The municipality (originally the parish) is named after the Stjørdalen valley. The first element is the word  which means "upper", referring to the fact that it is the upper part of the valley. The second element is the genitive case of the local river name  (now called the Stjørdalselva river). The meaning of the river name is unknown.

Government
During its existence, this municipality was governed by a municipal council of elected representatives, which in turn elected a mayor.

Mayors
The mayors of Øvre Stjørdal:

 1850–1851: Haftor Gundersen Skjelstad 
 1851–1853: Halvor Johnsen Øverkil
 1854–1857: Sivert Andreas Fergstad
 1858–1861: Johannes Røyem
 1862–1865: Jens Henrik Winsnes
 1866–1869: Johannes Røyem
 1869–1873: Halvor Johnsen Øverkil

See also
List of former municipalities of Norway

References

Meråker
Stjørdal
Former municipalities of Norway
1850 establishments in Norway
1874 disestablishments in Norway